The 2016 RA Africa Cup Sevens was a rugby sevens tournament held in Safaricom Stadium, Nairobi, Kenya on 23–24 September 2016. It was the 4th championship in a series that began in 2013.

The top two placed teams (excluding Kenya) will qualify to the 2017 Hong Kong Sevens, where they will have a chance to earn core team status in the Sevens World Series

Teams

Pool Stage

Teams ranked 1-4 qualify to Cup Semi-finals
Teams ranked 5-8 qualify to Plate semi-finals
Teams ranked 9-12 go into relegation semi-finals

All times Eastern Africa Time (UTC+3)

Pool A

Pool B

Pool C

Pool D

Knockout stage

Relegation Semi-Final

Plate Semi-final

Cup Semi-final

Final standings

References

2016
2016 rugby sevens competitions
2016 in African rugby union
rugby union
International rugby union competitions hosted by Kenya